"Mr Humphreys and His Inheritance" is a ghost story by British writer  M. R. James, included in his 1911 collection More Ghost Stories of an Antiquary.

Plot summary
Mr Humphreys has recently inherited an estate in Wilsthorpe, England. There he learns about the mysterious death of his uncle, the previous owner, and the history of the strange maze and temple situated beside his new home.

Adaptation
The story was adapted for television as part of the ITV Schools educational strand in 1976. This production is available on DVD as an extra on the Network DVD of the 1979 ITV Playhouse production of Casting the Runes.

References

External links

 
Full text of "Mr Humphreys and His Inheritance"
A Podcast to the Curious: Episode 15 – Mr Humphreys and His Inheritance

Short stories by M. R. James
1911 short stories
Horror short stories